Air VIA served the following destinations (as of December 2012). The airline ceased operations in 2016.

Asia
Israel
Tel Aviv – Ben Gurion International Airport
United Arab Emirates
Sharjah – Sharjah International Airport

Europe
Austria
Salzburg – Salzburg Airport
Vienna – Vienna Airport
Bulgaria
Bourgas – Bourgas Airport
Sofia – Sofia Airport
Varna – Varna Airport
Czech Republic
Prague – Prague Ruzyně Airport
Germany
Berlin – Schönefeld Airport
Cologne/Bonn – Cologne Bonn Airport
Dortmund – Dortmund Airport
Dresden – Dresden Airport
Düsseldorf – Düsseldorf Airport
Erfurt – Erfurt-Weimar Airport
Frankfurt – Frankfurt Airport
Hamburg – Hamburg Airport
Hannover – Hannover Airport
Leipzig – Leipzig/Halle Airport
Munich – Munich Airport
Münster – Münster Osnabrück International Airport
Nuremberg – Nuremberg Airport
Paderborn – Paderborn Lippstadt Airport
Stuttgart – Stuttgart Airport
Hungary
Budapest – Liszt Ferenc International Airport
Switzerland
Basel – Euro Airport
United Kingdom
Belfast – Belfast International Airport

Air VIA